Moga Airport  is an airport serving  Moga, a hamlet in the Maniema Province of the Democratic Republic of the Congo.

See also

Transport in the Democratic Republic of the Congo
List of airports in the Democratic Republic of the Congo

References

External links
Google Maps - Moga
FallingRain - Moga Airport

Airports in Maniema